

Results by parliamentary constituency

The results of the 2010 United Kingdom general election, by parliamentary constituency were as follows:

See also
Results of the 2017 United Kingdom general election
Results of the 2015 United Kingdom general election
List of political parties in the United Kingdom
List of United Kingdom by-elections (1979–present)

Notes

References

2010 United Kingdom general election
Results of United Kingdom general elections by parliamentary constituency